Lorentz Reige (born 23 February 1990) is a Swedish ballroom dancer. He was born in Sweden and in spite of his young age he has performed and competed in several countries outside Sweden. In 2005, he won the Swedish Ten Dance National Championships in the 16–18 age category.

His partner is Victoria Briding, and they have been dancing together as a couple since September 2003. 

He has competed both in his default class and in others. Usually he competes in the Amateur class (18–35 years), since there are so few talented young dancers in Sweden to compete with. Recently he placed second in a Swedish competition (national, not open to the world) in the Amateur class. First in this competition was Gustaf Lundin and Valentina Oseledko who have many years behind them in this class. 

As one of few Swedish dancers, Lorentz has competed in British Open of the Blackpool Dance Festival. It is the world's biggest competition and has a very good reputation. It is known worldwide for the high standard of the couples who enter the competition. In the Standard under-16 class, he managed to get to the 18th position. 

As of 26 May 2005, he and Victoria are on the second place on Dancesportinfo's World Junior Ballroom rating list.

References

Sources
Swedish dance sport federation
Dance Club Elit Stockholm
Dancesportinfo.net
Diamant Dancesport Club

Swedish ballroom dancers
1990 births
Living people
21st-century Swedish dancers